Geraint Meurig Vaughan Watkins (born 5 February 1951) is a Welsh singer, songwriter, rock and roll pianist and accordionist. He has backed many notable artists, including Nick Lowe, Dave Edmunds, Van Morrison, Mark Knopfler, Paul McCartney, Roy St. John, Shakin' Stevens and most recently Status Quo. He has also pursued a solo career and issued a number of albums under his own name, the most recent of which, Rush of Blood, was released in September 2019.

Biography
Watkins was born in Abertridwr, near Caerphilly, South Wales.

After time in the early 1970s at Portsmouth Art College, he returned to Cardiff and played with Red Beans And Rice and Juice on the Loose. The band, Red Beans And Rice, attracted attention and moved to London to further their career. When they disbanded Watkins played solo performances in London's pubs and with various bands, such as Southside United (with which he recorded an album), the Cable Layers, Klondike Pete and the Huskies, the band of Southend's, Micky Jupp on the 'Be Stiff Route 78' tour. He went on to record an album, Geraint Watkins & The Dominators (1979), produced by Andy Fairweather Low. Session work followed: producer Stuart Colman recruited him for what became hit records for Shakin' Stevens, also he was recording and/or performing with Dr. Feelgood, Rory Gallagher, Andy Fairweather Low, The Fabulous Thunderbirds, The Blues Band, Box of Frogs, Stray Cats, Carl Perkins, Crazy Cavan and the Rhythm Rockers and Eric Clapton amongst others. He was a member of the star-studded Willie & the Poor Boys alongside Bill Wyman and other Rolling Stones, taking lead vocals on two numbers. 

Inbetween sessions, the 1980s and beyond found Watkins playing accordion and piano with The Balham Alligators, a band, of which he was a founding member, that has helped to keep the music of Louisiana alive in London's pubs. Throughout the 1980s he also was a mainstay in Dave Edmunds's band, both recording and touring with him. Between 1984 and 1989 Watkins played piano and accordion on five records of the Dutch band Normaal. He contributed vocals, piano and accordion to Klondike Pete and the Huskies' 1981 album "Some of the Fellers" and appears, as Lightning Wanson G, on their 2010 album "Who Axed You". In recent years Watkins has found time to work with Bill Wyman's Rhythm Kings; contributing to Nick Lowe albums, The Impossible Bird (1994), Dig My Mood (1998), The Convincer (2001), Untouched Takeaway (2004) and At My Age (2007); and to Van Morrison albums, Back on Top (1999), Down the Road (2002), Pay the Devil (2006) and Keep It Simple (2008).

As well as the early vinyl LP with The Dominators, Watkins has released four solo albums Watkins - Bold As Love (1997), Dial W For Watkins (2004), In A Bad Mood (2008) and Moustique (2014). AllMusic's Stephen Thomas Erlewine said of Dial W For Watkins, "It's slight on the surface – the love songs are sweet and short, there are lots of ragged edges and lots of jokes – but that's its appeal: it's warm, friendly, engaging music, perfect for a relaxing evening at home with old friends."
Kerry Doole of Exclaim! called it "an unassuming but delightful effort."
Jason MacNeil of PopMatters suggested that Watkins' proficiency in a multitude of music genres "is what makes this album so bloody special."

Billboard contributor Paul Sexton wrote that In a Bad Mood "displays Watkins' love for vintage R&B but also has more surprising sorties into chanson and cajun."
Sexton ranked it as the number one album of 2008 on his year-end list; Billboard deputy global editor Tom Ferguson listed the album at number two.

In 2009 and 2011, Watkins toured with Bill Wyman's Rhythm Kings as keyboard and accordion player and singer. He toured with Peter Green & Friends as a keyboard player in 2010. Watkins also toured with, and opened for, Nick Lowe, as a keyboardist.

In 2014 he played accordion on Status Quo's Aquostic (Stripped Bare) album. This was also featured, on 22 October 2014, as a live concert from the Roundhouse on BBC Radio 2 and on BBC television via the red button. Watkins played with the band on the subsequent UK tour. In September 2016 he performed, as part of the Aquostic line-up, at BBC Radio 2's Live in Hyde Park from Hyde Park, London.

As a songwriter, Geraint had had his compositions covered by Don McLean, Pokey LaFarge, Dave Edmunds, NRBQ, Pearl Harbor, and the Holmes Brothers amongst others.

Watkins maintains his own Facebook page, where he frequently posts intimate musical performances.

A solo studio album, Rush of Blood, recorded in collaboration with Basement Jaxx's Simon Ratcliffe as producer, was released in 2019.

Albums

Dick Lovejoy's Original Southside United Volume 1

Track listing
"Flip Flop and Fly"
"In the Dark"
"Don't Lie to Me"
"Oh What a Price #1"
"Softly Softly #2"
"Ain't No Love"
"Put the Blame on Me"
"Something on Your Mind"
"Heart to Heart"
"Ain't Nobody's Business"
"Bring It On Home"
"Love Letters"
"Who Will Your Next Fool Be"
"Blues Bug"
"It Hurts Me Too"
"Can't Get the Stuff"
"Southside Skank - Outro"

Personnel
Geraint Watkins - Piano & Vocals
Len Davies - Bass Guitar
Jon Eldred - Trumpet
 Malcolm Hine - Slide Guitar
Brendan Hoban - Guitar
Matt Irvine - Bass Guitar
Dick Lovejoy - Drums & Voice-overs
Andy Macdonald - Baritone Sax
 Lou Martin - Hammond Organ
Frank Mead - Alto Sax
John Newey - Timbales
Nick Payne - Tenor & Alto Sax
Nick Pentelow - Tenor Sax
Jimmy Roche - Guitar
Jamie Rowan - Piano & Vocals
Stevie Smith - Harmonica & Vocals
Roger Sutton - Bass Guitar
 Pete Thomas - Tenor Sax
 Steve Waller - Guitar & Vocals
Diz Watson - Piano & Vocals
Diana Wood - Vocals

Production credits
Produced by Barry Durdant-Hollamby
Recorded at The Vineyard, South London

Geraint Watkins & the Dominators

Track listing
"Man Smart Woman Smarter"
"Casting My Spell"
"In The Night"
"Grow Too Old"
"Blue Moon of Kentucky"
"Gotta Find My Baby"
"Paralysed"
"Nobody"
"Deep in the Heart of Texas"
"Don't You Just Know It"
"If Walls Could Talk"
"My Baby Left Me"
"Cakewalk into Town"

Personnel
Geraint Watkins - vocals, piano, organ, electric piano, accordion, percussion
 Andy Fairweather Low - drums, bass, vocals, moog bass, percussion, acoustic guitar
 Mickey Gee - guitar, vocals, backing vocals, percussion, acoustic guitar
John David - bass, vocals, percussion, backing vocals
 Dave Charles - drums, backing vocals
 Steve Gregory - saxophones, backing vocals
Buddy Beadle - saxophones, backing vocals
 Henry Spinetti - drums, backing vocals

Production credits
A Booga Rooga production - Andy Fairweather-Low
Engineered by Dave Charles
Recorded at the Old Mill Rockfield also at Rockfield Studios
Mixed at Rockfield Studios

Bold as Love

Track listing
"My Happy Day"
"I Love Being in Love"
"It's A Wonderful Life"
"Don't Stop"
"Sweetheart"
"Don't Knock It"
"Honey Honey"
"It's Over"
"It's A Beautiful Day"
"Oobee Doobee Eyes"
"Big Bad Dog"
"Mr Blue"
"It's A Wonderful Life (again)"

Personnel
Geraint Watkins - vocals, guitar, keyboards, piano
 Nick Lowe - bass guitar, acoustic guitar - track 11
Robert Trehern - drums
Nick Pentelow - horns
Bob Loveday - violin - track 3
Steve Donnelly - acoustic guitar - tracks 3-4
Peter Glenister - additional guitar - track 4

Production credits
Produced by Neil Brockbank, Bobby Irwin
Recorded at The Bonaparte Rooms - Twickenham, RAK studios and Balham
Mixed at The Bonaparte Rooms and Alaska Studios

The Official Bootleg

Track listing
"Ain't Nobody Here But Us Chickens"
"Old Shep"
"Georgia"
"The Jealous Kind"
"Chicken Shack"
"Mess Around"
"Flip Flop And Fly"
"Ain't Nobody's Business"
"Carless Love"
"Stardust"

Personnel
Geraint Watkins - piano, vocals

The Bootleg after the Bootleg

Track listing
"Heroes and Villains"
"Ruby"
"Secret Love"
"Love Letters"
"Happy Day"
"Wonderful Live"
"Nature Boy"
"Yesterday"
"Who's Kissing Her Now" (1st version)
"Stardust" (new version)
"Carless Love" (new version)
"Who's Kissing Her Now" (2nd version)
"Georgia" (new 1st version)"
"Yo Yo"
"You've Changed"
"Balham High Road"
"Mess Around"
"Old Shep"
"Pennies From Heaven"
"Diddy Wah Diddy"
"Nobody Here But Us Chickens" (new version)
"Georgia" (new 2nd version)

Personnel
Geraint Watkins - piano, vocals

Dial 'W' for Watkins

Track listing
"Two Rocks"
"Turn That Chicken Down"
"Be My Love"
"Blessed With Happiness"
"The Whole Night Through"
"Cold War"
"Heroes And Villains"
"Soldier of Love"
"I Will"
"I'm Just Crazy About You"
"Bring Me The Head of My So Called Lover"
"Heaven"
"Only A Rose"
"Go West"

Production Credits
Produced by Neil Brockbank & Warent Atkins

Personnel
Geraint Watkins - vocals, guitar, keyboards, piano
 Nick Lowe - bass guitar, vocals
Steve Donnelly - acoustic guitar, electric guitar, bass guitar
Robert Trehern - drums, drum loops, vocals
Peter Glenister - organ, bass guitar
Matt Radford - upright bass
 Sterling Roswell - percussion

In a Bad Mood

Track listing 

"Easy To Say (Bon Temps Rouler)"
"Champion"
"Unto You"
"Fools Like Me"
"Chagrin"
"My Love"
"Bourgeoise"
"History"
"Jenni"
"Heart of the City"
"Catch On"
"At Last"

Production Credits 
Produced by Neil Brockbank and Geraint Watkins

Personnel 
Geraint Watkins - vocals, guitar, organ, piano
Nick Lowe - rhythm guitar
Steve Donnelly - lead guitar
Robert Trehern - drums
Matt Radford - vertical bass
Johnny Scott - rhythm guitar
Matt Holland - flugelhorn, trumpet
Andy Wood - trombone
Trevor Myers - euphonium, trombone
Martin Winning - clarinet
Katherine Johnstone - backing vocals

Rush of Blood

Track listing
"Rush of Blood"
"Hold Back"
"Heart of Stone"
"Middle of the Night"
"Heaven Only Knows"
"On the Nside"
"On My Mind"
"I Got the Blues"
"Reason to Live"
"Another Day Over"
"Another Day Over (Reprise)"
"Wherever There's Love" (bonus track)

Notes
 George Martin, Making Music: The Guide to Writing, Performing & Recording - Page 189, W. Morrow, 1983, 
 Pianist Geraint Watkins: 'Dial W' Pianist Geraint Watkins: 'Dial W'''] by David Greenberger at National Public Radio

References

External links
, from In a Bad Mood'', 2008, Goldtop AU79CD002

 

1951 births
Living people
People from Caerphilly County Borough
Singers from London
Musicians from Swansea 
Welsh multi-instrumentalists
Welsh session musicians
Welsh keyboardists
Welsh singer-songwriters
Welsh guitarists
British percussionists
British accordionists
British rhythm and blues musicians
British blues musicians
British rock pianists
Status Quo (band) members
Bill Wyman's Rhythm Kings members
21st-century accordionists
Vertigo Records artists
Yep Roc Records artists
Proper Records artists